Michael Haga (born 10 March 1992) is a Norwegian professional ice hockey player who is currently playing with Black Wings Linz in the ICE Hockey League (ICEHL).

Playing career
He played youth ice hockey in Norway for Frisk Asker before making his senior debut in the GET-ligaen in the 2008–09 season. He has played in the SHL with Luleå HF and Djurgårdens IF before, on April 27, 2016, he opted to join Örebro HK on a one-year agreement.

Following Mora IK's relegation to the Allsvenskan after the 2018–19 season, Haga left the team to remain in the SHL by signing a two-year contract with Djurgården, where he was previously loaned on two occasions, on May 11, 2019.

References

External links

1992 births
Living people
People from Asker
AIK IF players
Almtuna IS players
EHC Black Wings Linz players
Djurgårdens IF Hockey players
Frisk Asker Ishockey players
Lukko players
Luleå HF players
Mora IK players
Norwegian ice hockey left wingers
Örebro HK players
Sparta Warriors players
Sportspeople from Viken (county)